Hallam Robert Hope (born 17 March 1994) is a professional footballer who plays as a forward for National League club Oldham Athletic. Born in England, Hope represents Barbados internationally after representing England up to under-19 level.

He joined the Academy at Everton in 2005. He never played a senior game for the club, though spent brief loan spells at Northampton Town, Bury and Sheffield Wednesday in 2014, before joining Bury permanently in January 2015, who would end the 2014–15 season being promoted out of League Two. He spent most of the 2015–16 season on loan at Carlisle United, and after establishing himself in the Bury first-team during the 2016–17 campaign, he joined Carlisle United on a permanent basis in June 2017. He spent two-and-a-half seasons with the club, before joining Swindon Town in January 2020. Swindon went on to win promotion as champions of League Two at the end of the 2019–20 season, though his appearances were limited as the season was ended in early March.

Club career

Everton
Hope was spotted playing at a tournament in Manchester at the age of 12 and chose to join Everton after a trial at Manchester City. He signed a full-time scholarship with the club in 2010. He was named as Academy Player of the Season for the 2011–12 campaign. In September 2013, he signed a two-year contract with the club and was given squad number 37.

On 2 January 2014, Hope joined League Two side Northampton Town on a month's loan. He made his debut on 4 January, scoring in a 2–1 win at Newport County. He made a further two appearances for the "Cobblers" before returning to Everton on 30 January.

On 27 March 2014, Hope joined League Two side Bury on loan until the end of the 2013–14 season. He made an immediate impact at Bury, netting a debut goal in a 3–0 win over former club Northampton Town at Sixfields on 29 March. Three days later he scored again in a 2–1 win over Bristol Rovers at Gigg Lane. On 26 April, he scored a hat-trick in a 4–4 draw with Portsmouth. This made him the first Bury player to score a hat-trick since Ian Lawson in 1999.

On 29 August 2014, Hope joined Championship side Sheffield Wednesday on loan until 1 January. He made his debut the next day at Hillsborough, coming on as a substitute for Joe Mattock in the 85th-minute, in a 1–0 loss to Nottingham Forest. He impressed head coach Stuart Gray despite only playing for just over five minutes, who said that "he showed his power and strength and willingness to run at defenders". However, with only four appearances for the "Owls", he returned to Goodison Park on 29 October after being recalled by Everton.

Bury
On 11 November 2014, Hope returned to Bury on loan until 3 January 2015. Despite not scoring in his seven appearances for Bury that season, he signed permanently for an undisclosed fee (later revealed to be £100,000) on a three-and-a-half year deal starting at the end of his loan. Manager David Flitcroft said "his potential is frightening and I love working with him". Flitcroft had tried to sign him at the start of the season before Wednesday came in with their loan offer. However Hope struggled despite Bury being in good form – winning automatic promotion at the end of the 2014–15 season – and scored only one goal in his first 32 appearances since joining permanently; Flitcroft tried to accommodate him on the wings before bringing in veteran winger Chris Eagles and stated that Hope "has been a victim of the fine form of Leon Clarke, Tom Pope and Danny Rose".

On 22 October 2015, Hope joined Carlisle United on a one-month loan deal. He made three appearances for the "Cumbrians", scoring in a 2–0 win over Plymouth Argyle on 7 November to take them into the second round of the FA Cup. He picked up an ankle injury during the game and was sidelined for two months, but nevertheless had his loan spell extended until 22 January. Upon his recovery the loan was extended until the end of the 2015–16 season. Carlisle reached the fourth round of the FA Cup, and Hope came on as a half-time substitute as former club Everton recorded a 3–0 victory at Brunton Park. He was sent off for the first time in his career on 16 April, having made a dangerous challenge on Darnell Furlong during at goalless draw at Cambridge United. He scored five goals in 25 games for Carlisle, who felt unable to fund a permanent move for the player.

Hope remained at Bury for the 2016–17 season, scoring five goals in 39 appearances as the club posted a 19th-place finish in League One under the stewardship of Lee Clark.

Carlisle United
On 29 June 2017, Hope signed a two-year contract with Carlisle United. On joining the club he stated that he hoped to play at centre-forward, but would be happy to play in other positions if required to do so. Manager Keith Curle spoke of his previous efforts to sign Hope and joked that "I’ve probably chased Hallam more than I’ve ever chased anyone else through my whole life - ex-wife, ex-partner and current girlfriend included!" However Hope struggled at centre-forward and received criticism from "Blues" supporters, though by March had regained confidence and form playing as an left-sided attacking midfielder. He ended the 2017–18 season with 18 goals in 49 appearances, finishing as the club's top-scorer. He was set a target of 15 goals for the 2018–19 season, with assistant manager Tommy Wright describing him as "one of the best attacking players in this division". He was shortlisted for the League Two Player of the Month award after scoring three goals and claiming an assist as the club rose up the League Two table in January. He signed a contract extension in March to keep him at Carlisle until 2020. He achieved his target, scoring 15 goals in 44 games to become the club's top-scorer for the second successive season.

The club turned down a transfer bid from an unnamed club for Hope in August 2019. The club was speculated to be League One club Blackpool, though this was disputed after manager Terry McPhillips was replaced by Simon Grayson. Carlisle manager Steven Pressley suggested that the player's "head has been turned" by transfer speculation but defended him after fans began to jeer Hope following a downturn in performances. He further backed the player in October after Hope rejected a call-up from Barbados to instead play for Carlisle. Upon Hope's departure from Carlisle, manager Chris Beech said that "he's been superb for me from the moment I came through the door" but that his sale represented a "good deal for the club".

Swindon Town
Hope joined Swindon Town for an undisclosed fee on 22 January 2020, signing an 18-month contract. He had been a target for "Robins" manager Richie Wellens at the start of the season, who was in desperate need of a striker after loanees Jerry Yates and top-scorer Eoin Doyle were both recalled to their parent clubs. Three days later he scored on his debut at the County Ground, as Swindon recorded a 3–0 victory over Port Vale. He scored a total of two goals from five games before the 2019–20 season was ended early due to the COVID-19 pandemic in England, with Swindon being promoted as champions after the league table was settled on a points per game basis.

On 14 May 2021, it was announced that he would leave Swindon at the end of the season, following the expiry of his contract.

Oldham Athletic
Hope joined Oldham Athletic on a free transfer on 22 June 2021, signing a one-year contract. He remained for another year after Oldham dropped down to the National League for the first time.

International career
Hope represented England at under-16 (two goals in seven games), under-17 (12 goals in 17 games), under-18 (two goals in two games) and under-19 level (two goals in six games). He was in England's squads for the 2011 FIFA U-17 World Cup, 2011 UEFA European Under-17 Championship and 2012 UEFA European Under-19 Championship.

He was also eligible to represent Barbados through his father, Russell, who emigrated to England before Hope was born. His paternal grandfather hails from Trinidad and Tobago. He accepted a call up from Barbados and made his senior international debut on 5 September 2018, scoring both his nation's goals in a 2–2 draw with Guyana in a CONCACAF Nations League qualifying game. In December 2018, CONCACAF declared Hope ineligible to represent Barbados, wiping his two appearances and two goals. However, Hope returned to international duty and on 19 November 2019 he scored twice in a 3–0 victory over the Cayman Islands to secure promotion for Barbados into League B of the CONCACAF Nations League.

Personal life
On 3 September 2022, Hope was seriously injured in an attack outside Oldham Athletic’s Boundary Park ground. The incident occurred in the club car park, with Hope requiring hospital treatment to an injury expected to keep him out of action for several weeks.

Style of play
Hope can play as a forward or winger, though is primarily utilised on the left-side of an attacking three. David Flitcroft, former Bury manager, was a big fan of Hope and in January 2015 said that "he adds power, speed, strength and potency to our squad". Carlisle first-team coach Paul Murray praised his work rate in training and said that "Hallam is quiet but he leads by example". Carlisle's assistant manager Tommy Wright said that "he’s direct and he isn’t frightened to run with the ball. If it goes wrong for him he gets the ball and tries again". He has been praised for his finishing skills, movement and aerial threat but has been crtiicised for a lack of aggression, work rate and left-foot ability.

Career statistics

Club

International

Scores and results list Barbados's goal tally first, score column indicates score after each Hope goal.

Honours
Bury
Football League Two third-place promotion: 2014–15

Swindon Town
EFL League Two: 2019–20

References

External links

1994 births
Living people
Footballers from Manchester
Barbadian footballers
English footballers
Association football midfielders
Association football wingers
Association football forwards
Everton F.C. players
Northampton Town F.C. players
Bury F.C. players
Sheffield Wednesday F.C. players
Carlisle United F.C. players
Swindon Town F.C. players
Oldham Athletic A.F.C. players
English Football League players
England youth international footballers
Barbados international footballers
Barbadian people of English descent
Barbadian people of Trinidad and Tobago descent
Sportspeople of Trinidad and Tobago descent
English sportspeople of Barbadian descent
English sportspeople of Trinidad and Tobago descent
Black British sportspeople
People with acquired Barbadian citizenship
English victims of crime